The men's 1 km time trial at the 1958 British Empire and Commonwealth Games, was part of the cycling programme, which took place in July 1958.

Results

References

Men's 1km time trial
Cycling at the Commonwealth Games – Men's 1 km time trial